Chesnokov (masculine) or Chesnokova (feminine) is a Russian surname that is derived from the word чеснок (chesnok, meaning "garlic").  It is the last name of the following people:

 Andrei Chesnokov (born 1966), former professional tennis player
 Andriy Chesnokov
 Dmitri Chesnokov (1973–2019), Russian professional football player
 Glikeriya Vasilievna Bogdanova-Chesnokova (1904–1983), Soviet theatre and film actress, operetta's prima donna
 Mikhail Chesnokov (born 1961), retired Russian professional football player
 Pavel Chesnokov (1877–1944), Russian composer, conductor, and teacher
 Sergey Chesnokov (born 1943), Soviet/Russian scientist, researcher, mathematician, sociologist, musician, specialist in data analysis
 Valentina Feodorovna Chesnokova (1934–2010), Russian sociologist, sociopsychologist and translator of sociology works
 Yuri Chesnokov (1952–1999), Soviet football player
 Yuri Chesnokov (volleyball) (1933–2010), Russian volleyball player

Russian-language surnames